Karaçerçili (literally Black-peddler) is a village in Tarsus district of Mersin Province, Turkey. It is situated in Çukurova (Cilicia of the antiquity) to the southeast of Tarsus and to the west of Berdan River. The population of Karaçerçili was 305 as of 2012. The main economic activity is agriculture and the main crop is cotton.

References

Villages in Tarsus District